Richard Thacker Morris (1917-1981) was a professor of Sociology at the University of California at Los Angeles.  He was the author of The Two-Way Mirror: National Status in Foreign Students' Adjustment (1960), as well as The White Reaction Study (1967), an important work on urban race relations.

Academic career

Morris earned his Ph.D. at Ohio State University in 1952, where his doctoral dissertation employed the paradigm method in order to develop a general model of social stratification.  In addition to his dissertation and two published books, his work also included numerous articles which appeared in such peer-reviewed journals as the American Journal of Sociology, American Sociological Review, Sociological Inquiry, and Sociology and Social Research.  He held a professorship at UCLA from 1953–1976, during which time he did research as a Fulbright scholar in the Netherlands (1963–64).  During his tenure at UCLA, he also served as Acting Dean of the School of Social Welfare, and later as Chairman of the Department of Sociology.  He was also an associate editor and book review editor of American Sociological Review.

References

1917 births
1981 deaths
American sociologists
California Democrats
Ohio State University alumni
People from Los Gatos, California
People from Malibu, California
University of California, Los Angeles faculty
Writers from Ohio